The 1995 British Formula Three season was the 45th British Formula Three Championship, won by Oliver Gavin. The season started on 26 March at Silverstone and ended at Thruxton on 15 October following eighteen races. Having finished runner-up to Kelvin Burt two years previously, Gavin took the risk of dropping back down to Formula Three off the back of an unsuccessful season in Formula 3000 and was able to narrowly clinch the title at the final round from fellow Briton Ralph Firman. Class B was won by Martin Byford.

Drivers and Teams

Race calendar and results

Championship Standings

References
AUTOCOURSE 1995-96British Motorsport Year 1995-96

External links
 The official website of the British Formula 3 Championship

Formula Three
British Formula Three Championship seasons